"I Want to Thank You" is a song by American singer Alicia Myers, released in 1981, originally as a track from her debut album, Alicia (1981). The song was later included as a single on her 1982 album, I Fooled You This Time, due to its heavy rotation in clubs by DJs in the United States and United Kingdom. The song was written by Kevin McCord, who also produced it alongside Irene Perkins. It debuted on the Hot Black Singles chart, where it ran for 11 weeks, peaking at number 37 in November 1982.

Charts

Weekly charts

Year-end charts

Robin S. version

"I Want to Thank You" was later re-recorded as a house track by American singer and songwriter Robin S., released in March 1994 as the fourth single from her debut album, Show Me Love (1993). This version was produced by Allen George, Fred McFarlane, and Junior Vasquez. It was a minor hit in Europe, peaking at number 39 in Belgium and number 48 on the UK Singles Chart. On the US Billboard Bubbling Under Hot 100 chart, it reached number three.

Critical reception
Larry Flick from Billboard wrote, "Thanks in large part to the eternally golden remix hand of David Morales, the voice behind the massive "Show Me Love" is poised to flood dancefloors again. Her solid rendition of this gospel-tinged disco evergreen is enhanced by Morales' savvy blend of groove and slick synths. Junior Vasquez, the track's original co-producer, drops a couple of sturdy versions that are darker and geared more toward underground tastes." British magazine Music Weeks RM Dance Update declared it as a "smooth soulful cover version". An editor, James Hamilton, described it as a "incredibly coincidental almost Degrees of Motion ["Shine On"] answering 'thank you Heavenly Father for shining your light on me' inspirational loper". Chuck Arnold from Philadelphia Daily News complimented it as a "spiritual stomper".

Track listings

 12-inch single, UK (1994)"I Want to Thank You" (Bad Yard Club Mix)
"I Want to Thank You" (Bad Yard Dub)
"I Want to Thank You" (Accapella)
"I Want to Thank You" (Extended Mix)
"I Want to Thank You" (Extended Dub Mix)
"I Want to Thank You" (Africa)

 CD single, France (1994)"I Want to Thank You" (Radio Edit) — 3:48
"I Want to Thank You" (L.P Edit) — 3:58

 CD single, UK (1994)"I Want to Thank You" (Radio Edit) — 3:50
"I Want to Thank You" (Radio Edit 2) — 3:55
"I Want to Thank You" (Bad Yard Club Mix) — 9:02
"I Want to Thank You" (Bad Yard Dub) — 5:46
"I Want to Thank You" (Accapella) — 0:49
"I Want to Thank You" (Extended Mix) — 5:38
"I Want to Thank You" (Extended Dub) — 4:45
"I Want to Thank You" (Africa) — 5:38

 CD maxi, Germany (1994)'
"I Want to Thank You" (Radio Edit) — 3:48
"I Want to Thank You" (Radio Edit 2) — 3:58
"I Want to Thank You" (Bad Yard Club Mix) — 8:59

Charts

References

1981 songs
1982 singles
1994 singles
1994 songs
 MCA Records singles
Big Beat Records (American record label) singles
Champion Records singles
Category:Alicia Myers songs
Robin S. songs
Chanté Moore songs